COSMOS is the scientific journal of the Singapore National Academy of Science. It is published twice annually by World Scientific and covers interdisciplinary research in Science and Mathematics.

See also
Cosmos. Problems of Biological Sciences
Cosmos magazine

References

Publications established in 2005
World Scientific academic journals
English-language journals
Multidisciplinary scientific journals